Buber (Hebrew: בובר) is a Jewish surname. Notable people with the surname include:

Martin Buber, Austrian-born Israeli Jewish scholar, socialist and Zionist
Solomon Buber (1827–1906), grandfather of Martin, Jewish scholar and editor of Hebrew works
Margarete Buber-Neumann (1901–1989), daughter-in-law of Martin

Jewish surnames

fr:Buber